Actia radialis is a species of tachinid flies in the genus Actia of the family Tachinidae.

Distribution
Québec, Ontario.

References

Insects described in 1991
Diptera of North America
radialis